"" ("The Hymn of Malta") is the national anthem of Malta. It is written in the form of a prayer to God. Officially adopted in 1964 upon independence from the United Kingdom, it was composed by Robert Samut, and the lyrics were written by Dun Karm Psaila.

History 
From the mid-19th century up to the early 1930s, Malta was passing through a national awakening. With the increased national awareness, it was felt by many thinkers that Malta should have its own national anthem. In 1850, Ġan Anton Vassallo composed "Innu Lil Malta", which used to be played during many Maltese political manifestations and meetings. In 1922, Robert Samut composed a short melody. A year later, A.V. Laferla, director of primary schools in Malta, obtained possession of this composition, as he wanted to have an anthem that could be sung by students in Malta's schools. Laferla asked Dun Karm to write lyrics that would fit with Samut's short melody. The poems of Dun Karm Psaila are well known for their religious and patriotic currents, and so are the verses written for Samut's anthem. The hymn was already being sung in December 1922, mostly in governmental schools. The first time it was heard in public was on 27 December 1922 and again on 6 January 1923, during two concerts at the Manoel Theatre. However, during its two first appearances, someone had changed some verses from the first stanza. This angered Dun Karm, who protested by writing an article in a local newspaper. Since then, the lyrics have remained unchanged. On 3 February 1923, another concert was held at the Manoel Theatre, performed by children from Sliema, with Dun Karm's original verses. The hymn was played by the Duke of Edinburgh's Band, of Vittoriosa.

The Maltese government declared the anthem as the official Maltese anthem on 22 February 1941. In 1942, it was printed for Piano e canto with an English translation by May Butcher. This publication helped spread its popularity. The 1964 Independence Constitution confirmed it as the National Anthem of Malta, which is today one of the symbols of Maltese identity.

On 25 March 1945, in the Gżira Stadium, a football match was held between a Malta XI and Hajduk Split, a team from Yugoslavia. At that time, Malta was still under British rule, and the British governor was present. Before the game, the band played the anthem of Yugoslavia, and then it played that of Great Britain, due to Malta's status as a colony. As the governor was about to sit, the attendees in the stadium stood up and sung the Maltese anthem. The governor, albeit embarrassed, stood up as well until the end of the anthem.

The anthem is played during all the official duties of the President of Malta, the Prime Minister of Malta and other important governmental personalities. It is played during all important national activities.

Lyrics

Notes

References

External links 
 The Maltese National AnthemA website on the anthem hosted by the Malta Department of Information, featuring an instrumental version.
 Anthem performance by the Malta Youth Orchestra
 INNU MALTI, die Nationalhymne der Republik Malta - Features instrumental version in MP3 format + brief history in German.
 Audio of the national anthem of Malta, with information and lyrics (archive link)
 Malta Hymne - A page on the anthem at the Swiss site "Malta4You".  Features instrumental versions in MIDI and MP3 format.
 Dun Karm Psaila - A biography
 Himnuszok - A vocal version of the Anthem, featured in the "Himnuszok" website.

National symbols of Malta
European anthems
Maltese songs
National anthems
National anthem compositions in A-flat major
National anthem compositions in F major
Maltese-language songs